The Prescription Drug Marketing Act (PDMA) of 1987 (P.L. 100-293, 102 Stat. 95) is a law of the United States federal government.  It establishes legal safeguards for prescription drug distribution to ensure safe and effective pharmaceuticals and is designed to discourage the sale of counterfeit, adulterated, misbranded, sub potent, and expired prescription drugs. It was passed in response to the development of a wholesale sub-market (known as the "diversion market") for prescription drugs.

The PDMA was modified by the Prescription Drug Amendments of 1992 (P.L. 102-353, 106 Stat. 941) on August 26, 1992.

The U.S. Food and Drug Administration (FDA) issued regulations implementing the PDMA in 1990 (21 C.F.R. Part 205) and 1999 (21 C.F.R. Part 203).

See also
 Food and Drug Administration (FDA, USA)
 Drug distribution
 Inverse benefit law
 Regulation of therapeutic goods

External links
PDMA article

Pharmaceutical industry in the United States
Pharmaceuticals policy
United States federal controlled substances legislation
United States federal health legislation
United States statutes that abrogate Supreme Court decisions